Elections were held in Jonglei State on April 10–15, 2010, as part of the 2010 Sudanese general election, with voting for President of Sudan, National Assembly of Sudan, President of Southern Sudan, Southern Sudan Legislative Assembly, Governor of Jonglei State and the Jonglei State Legislative Assembly. The elections were the first in Sudan for over two decades, held in the aftermath of the 2005 Comprehensive Peace Agreement between the Sudan People's Liberation Movement (SPLM) and the Government of Sudan of Omar al-Bashir. The election was carried out in precarious security conditions, with ethnic conflicts prevalent in the state. The elections were won by the SPLM, with the exception of a handful of seats. Disputes over the election results led to the outbreak of two armed insurgencies.

Electoral system

A new electoral law, the National Elections Act of 2008, was adopted in July 2008. For the elections for the presidencies of Sudan and South Sudan, elections would be held under an absolute majority system. If no candidate would obtained 50% of the votes cast plus one vote, a second round of the two most-voted candidates would be held. State governors, on the other hand, would be elected under a simple majority system whereby the most-voted candidate would be elected governor.

For the parliamentary elections (whether to the National Assembly, the Southern Sudan Legislative Assembly or the State Legislative Assemblies) the electoral legislation adopted in July 2008 stipulated a mixed electoral system - 60% of parliamentarians would be elected from single-member First Past the Post geographic constituencies. 15% of the parliamentarians would be elected through Proportional Representation Party-Lists. 25% of the parliamentarians  would be elected through Proportional Representation lists for women candidates.

The delimitation of constituency boundaries was based on the national population census published in May 2009, a census whose accuracy was disputed. Per the 2008 electoral legislation, constituencies should have been delimitated within a 30-day period. The National Electoral Commission tasked the state-level High Electoral Commissions to draft the constituency boundary delimitations. According to the Carter Center report, constituencies were “"vague, unmapped, and difficult for observers and election officials to comprehend". The electoral legislation established that the population in each geography constituencies for the National Assembly must not deviate by more than 15% from the average population size of the 270 geographic constituencies for the National Assembly (145,017 inhabitants). In Jonglei, there were significant deviations from the legislation. The Bor South National Assembly geographic constituency in the Jonglei state capital had the largest deviation of all 270 National Assembly geographic constituencies, hosting a population 52% larger than the national average.

Organization and context

At the time of the vote, Jonglei was the largest state in Sudan by area. The holding of the election presented logistic challenges, as much of the state was not reachable by road.  There were 600 polling stations and 670 committees across the state. Mecak Ajang Alaak was the Chairman of the Jonglei State Election High Commission.

A United Nations Mission in Sudan helicopter assisted the authorities to transport voting materials back to the state capital Bor. Delays in receiving ballot boxes from polling stations resulted in delays of announcement of preliminary results. Observers from the Carter Center observed party agents assisting Election Commission workers in counting of votes, but refrained from stating that this would have been a systematic practice.

595,901 persons were registered as voters. This was estimated to correspond to 88% of the population aged 18 years and above.  Each voter would be given 12 different ballots (President of Sudan, National Assembly of Sudan geographic constituency, National Assembly of Sudan Party-List, National Assembly of Sudan Women's List, President of Southern Sudan, Southern Sudan Legislative Assembly geographic constituency, Southern Sudan Legislative Assembly Party-List, Southern Sudan Legislative Assembly Women's List, Governor of Jonglei, Jonglei State Legislative Assembly geographic constituency, Jonglei State Legislative Assembly Party-List and Jonglei State Legislative Assembly Women's List).

From 2009 onwards inter-tribal violence in Jonglei escalated. In the run-up to the elections, politicians sought to capitalize on tribal rivalries to mobilize voters. Pre-electoral violence caused largescale population displacements in Jonglei.

SPLM nominations

Ahead of the election, it was widely presumed that SPLM would win and thus competition over SPLM tickets was fierce. The State SPLM Electoral College met on January 10, 2010, to decide the party nominations for the April election. The meeting evaluated 228 potential candidates. The State SPLM Electoral College ranked five candidates for governor, leaving to the SPLM Political Bureau to finalize the decision. The State SPLM Electoral College named 91 candidates for the other posts up for election.

William Borien Gola was nominated by the State SPLM Electoral College as the candidate for the Pibor West (Gumuruk, Lekwongole) geographic constituency for the Southern Sudan Legislative Assembly, but this decision was over-ridden by the SPLM Political Bureau which named Francis Lokurunga as the SPLM candidate for the seat.

Results

President of Sudan

Like in all southern states (except Upper Nile) the SPLM candidate Yasir Arman was the most voted presidential candidate. Yasir Arman finishing in second place nation-wide. The winning candidate and incumbent President Omar al-Bashir finished in third place in Jonglei. Independent candidate Mahmood Ahmed Jeha, who obtained 0.71% of the vote nation-wide, finished in second place in Jonglei. He obtained 39.50% of his nation-wide vote in Jonglei state alone.

National Assembly

Jonglei elected nine deputies from First Past the Post single member constituencies, two deputies from Proportional Representation Party-List vote and four deputies from Women's list vote (also Proportional Representation). SPLM won all seats, except the 8th parliamentary constituency (Akobo County) were the NCP candidate Riek Gai Kok defeated the SPLM candidate. In the case of the 6th constituency (Twic East County, Duk County) the SPLM candidate Atem Garang Deng was elected by acclamation.

The deputies elected on the Party-List were Lual Achuek Lual (Twic East County) and David Dhil Chol (Ayod County). The deputies elected on the Women's List were Emelda Modi Tombe (Akobo County), Munira John Abdelwahab (Pochalla County), Elizabeth John Kuol Akech (Pigi County) and Anna Abyei Wuor (Duk County).

Source: In the case of the Proportional Representation lists, only lists winning seats have their voting tally specified.

Source: In the 5th constituency, there were two different independent candidates, whose votes are combined in the table above.

President of Southern Sudan

Southern Sudan Legislative Assembly

Jonglei elected seventeen deputies from First Past the Post single member constituencies, four deputies from Proportional Representation Party-List vote and seven deputies from Women's list vote (also Proportional Representation). SPLM won all the Southern Sudan Legislative Assembly seats, except the 6th legislative constuency were independent candidate Timothy Taban Juch defeated the SPLM candidate and incumbent Southern Sudan Minister for Energy and Mining John Luk Jok.

Source: Data from 16 out of 17 constituencies, missing constituency no. 12 (Duk). In the case of the Proportional Representation lists, only lists winning seats have their voting tally specified.

''Source: Data from 16 out of 17 constituencies, missing constituency no. 12 (Duk).

Governor of Jonglei

In the gubernatorial election the incumbent caretaker governor Kuol Manyang Juuk of SPLM faced independent candidate George Athor Deng and Joseph Duer Jakor of the National Congress Party. Both Kuol Manyang and George Athor were from the Dinka tribe. At the January 10, 2010 State SPLM Electoral College, five leaders had expressed their interested in the gubernatorial nomination of the party, and were ranked by the State SPLM Electoral College in the following order: Kuol Manyang, George Athor, Rambang Luoth, Ismail Konyi and Duoth Nhial Pec.

Whilst George Athor refused to acknowledge Kuol Manyang's victory, the NCP candidate Joseph Duer called Kuol Manyang to congratulate him on winning the poll.

Jonglei State Legislative Assembly

29 state legislators were elected from First Past the Post single member constituencies, 7 state legislators from Proportional Representation Party-List vote and 14 state legislators from Women's list vote (also Proportional Representation). The United Democratic Front candidate William Mayian
Roak won the 5th legislative constituency (Ayod North) and independent candidate Peter Mabior Bol won the 15th legislative constituency (Uror North-East) seat. All other single-member legislative seats were won by SPLM candidates. Joyce James Konyi (UDF) and Martha Chol Luak (NCP) were the only non-SPM candidates elected from the Women's List vote. Duoth Koang Rueh (UDF) was the sole non-SPLM candidate election on the Party-List vote.

Athoc North rerun

In the 27th state legislature constituency (Athoc North in Bor County) independent candidate Kuol Bol Ayom had requested a re-run, as ballots had been missprinted. Kuol Bol's supported claimed that the National Election Commission had committed fraud by not allocating the correct election symbol to him on the ballot paper. On April 15, 2010, the National Election Commission ordered a re-run of the vote in the 27th state legislature constituency. However, on April 18, 2010, Kuol Bol sent a letter asking the National Election Commission to annul the decision for a re-run, arguing that he had withdrawn his complaint. Nevertheless, a re-run of the elections for the 27th state legislature seat was held in June 2010. Kuol Bol won the seat, obtaining 9,448 votes against 3,387 votes for the SPLM candidate Daniel Deng Kut. The two other candidates in the 27th constituency race, Buol Lual (independent) and Mayen Kur (NCP), had withdrawn from the race but still appeared on the ballot papers and each got less than 50 votes combined.

Aftermath

Violence in Jonglei continued to prevail after the holding of the elections. Following the announcement of the results, the defeated gubernatorial candidate George Athor charged the SPLM with rigging the vote, went into hiding and launched an armed insurgency. Another armed insurgency emerged led by David Yau Yau, who had lost the vote for the South Pibor seat in the Jonglei State Legislative Assembly.

On August 5, 2010, the Jonglei State Legislative Assembly voted 30 to 2 to dismiss the Pigi South legislator-elect John Agany, who had never appeared in the assembly after the election. John Agany was rumoured to have joined George Athor's insurgency.

See also

2010 Darfurian amalgamation referendum
2011 Southern Sudanese independence referendum

References

Elections in Sudan
Sudan Jonglei
Jonglei State
2010 in Sudan
2010 in South Sudan